Fighting Shadows is a 1935 American Western film directed by David Selman from a screenplay by Ford Beebe, which stars Tim McCoy, Robert Allen, Geneva Mitchell, and Ward Bond.

Cast List
 Tim McCoy as Tim O'Hara
 Robert Allen as Bob Rutledge
 Geneva Mitchell as Martha Harrison
 Ward Bond as Brad Harrison
 Si Jenks as Hank Bascom
 Otto Hoffman as Stalkey
 James Mason as Horn
 Bud Osborne as Randall
 Edward LeSaint as Duncan (as Edward Le Saint)
 Richard Alexander as Maddigan
 Allan Sears as Gavin
 Walter Shumway as Jones
 Jess Caven as Hawkins
 Fred Malatesta as Dusquesne
 Ethan Laidlaw as Brannon
 Howard C. Hickman as Inspector Rutledge
 George C. Pearce as Father O'Donovan
 Charles E. Brinley as Lakue
 Jack Mower as Orderly
 Rhody Hathaway as Woodsman
 Steve Clark as Woodsman
 Monte Carter as Trapper
 Robert Wilber as Trapper

(Cast list as per AFI database)

References

External links
 
 
 

1935 Western (genre) films
1935 films
American Western (genre) films
Films directed by David Selman
Columbia Pictures films
American black-and-white films
1930s English-language films
1930s American films